In narrative theory, actant is a term from the actantial model of semiotic analysis of narratives. The term also has uses in linguistics, sociology, computer programming theory, and astrology.

In narratology
Algirdas Julien Greimas (1917–1992), professor of semiotics, is widely credited with producing the actantial model in 1966. This model reveals the structural roles typically performed in story telling; such as "hero, villain (opponent of hero), object (of quest), helper (of hero) and sender (who initiates the quest)." Each of these roles fulfills an integral component of the story, or, narrative. Without the contribution of each actant, the story may be incomplete. Thus, an "actant" is not simply a character in a story, but an integral structural element upon which the narrative revolves.

An actant can also be described as a binary opposition pairing, such as a hero paired with a villain, a dragon paired with a dragon-slaying sword, a helper paired with an opponent. Actantial relationships are therefore incredibly useful in generating problems within a narrative that have to be overcome, providing contrast, or in defining an antagonistic force within the narrative. However, the same character can simultaneously have a different actant (or way of concern) in regard to a different sequence of action, event, or episode in the story. Therefore, it should be distinguished from a character's consistent role in the story like the archetype of a character. The concept of actant is important in structuralism of narratology to regard each situation as the minimum independent unit of story.

As defined by Julia Kristeva

In 1969, Julia Kristeva also attempted to understand  the dynamic development of the situations in narratives with Greimas's actantial model. She thought the subject and the object can exchange positions, and accordingly the supporter and the opponent can exchange positions too. Furthermore, the pair of subject and object sometimes exchanges its  position with the pair of supporter and opponent. There are, however, multiple overlapping situations in narrative at a given time. To contend with the overlapping situations present in all narrative structure, she called the potential actant shifts not "change", but "transformation." This should not be confused with Greimas's own transformational model, another narratological framework.

As defined by Vladimir Propp
Independently, researching Russian folklores, Vladimir Propp also provided the "7 act spheres":
Aggressor
Donor
Auxiliary
Princess and the father
Committer
Hero
Bogus hero
However, these are not the types of the person in the story, but rather patterns of behavior: the same person may sometimes act as one "sphere", and at other times as a different "sphere".

In linguistics

Linguist Lucien Tesnière considered the function of a verb as most important in dependency grammar and invented the term "actant", various persons that accompany a verb:
"prime actant", the nominative case
"second actant", the accusative case
"third actant", the dative case
This concept of actant is similar to that of argument.

Algirdas Julien Greimas redefined actants as the 3 pairs "Modulations":
The Actant-Subject and the Actant-Object of Action.
The Actant-Sender and the Actant-Receiver of Information
The Actant-Supporter and the Actant-Oppositionist of Volition.

In sociology

In sociology, the semiotic term "actant" was incorporated into the actor–network theory by Bruno Latour and Michel Callon, the activity of which is described as "mediation" or "translation".

In astrology
Since ancient times, astrology considered and analyzed the position of the persons concerning a situation with the symbols of the celestial objects and constellations. Georges Polti counted up the needed positions in his famous The Thirty-Six Dramatic Situations. Étienne Souriau reduced them to only 6 positions named "dramaturgic functions" with astrological symbols:
"The Leo", the thematic powered.
"The Sun", the valued.
"The Earth", the wished obtainer.
"The Mars", the oppositionist.
"The Libra", the judge of the situation.
"The Moon", Auxiliary.

Notes

References
 Georges Polti, Les XXXVI situations dramatiques, in French 1895.
 Étienne Souriau, Les deux cent mille situations dramatiques, in French 1950.
 Vladimir Propp, Morphologie du conte, in French 1928.
 Lucien Tesnière, Éléments de syntaxe structurale, in French 1959, 2nd ed. 1966.
 Algirdas Julien Greimas, Sémantique structurale, in French 1966.
 ---. 1973. "Actants, Actors, and Figures." On Meaning: Selected Writings in Semiotic Theory. Trans. Paul J. Perron and Frank H, Collins. Theory and History of Literature, 38. Minneapolis: University of Minnesota Press, 1987. 106-120.
 Julia Kristeva, Le texte du roman, in French 1967.

Actor-network theory
Functional programming
Semiotics